Lycée Molière may refer to:

In France:
  in Paris

Outside France (includes two schools in Spain also known as Liceo Molière or Liceo Francés Molière):
 Lycée Molière de Rio de Janeiro in Rio de Janeiro, Brazil
 Lycée Français Molière de Villanueva de la Cañada in Villanueva de la Cañada, Spain
 Lycée Français Molière de Saragosse in Zaragoza, Spain